Nam Phrik Kapi is a Thai shrimp paste chili sauce known as Nam phrik kapi (Thai:น้ำพริกกะปิ) is a popular representation of dipping sauce in Thailand, particularly central and southern. It matches very well with fried fish, namely mackerel and boiled vegetables such as boiled cabbage or fresh vegetables such as cucumber, eggplants.

Ingredients 
	Kapi (Thai shrimp paste)
	small Thai shallots
	head of garlic
	Thai bird’s eye chilies
	palm sugar
	fish sauce
	lime juice
	pea eggplant

Instructions 
Put small Thai shallots, Thai bird’s eye chilies and garlic in a mortar. Pound roughly, and then add Thai shrimp paste and palm sugar. Keep pounding lightly until well mixed. Enhance the flavor with lime juice and fish sauce. Put pea eggplant if you want.

Nutrition 
Thai shrimp paste 100 grams give 126 calories and there is a lot of nutrients. Shrimp paste is rich in calcium for strengthening bones and teeth. Chilies contain pepsin for increasing appetite, beta-carotene and vitamin C for maintaining healthy skin. Garlic has selenium, an antioxidant and antiseptic for preventing infections and reducing blood cholesterol.

References 

Shrimp paste chili sauce. (2012). Retrieved from http://www.thaifoodheritage.com/en/recipe_list/detail/17 
Thai Shrimp Paste Chilli Dipping Sauce (Nam Prik Kapi). (2015). Retrieved from http://siamsizzles.com/thai-shrimp-paste-chilli-dipping-sauce-nam-prik-kapi/
Sonakul, S. (1992). Thai cuisine. Bangkok: Prachandra.
Noor, M.I. (2000). Food of Asian. Kuala Lumpur: Misas.
Amatyakul, C. (1992). Cooking Thai. Bangkok: AKSORN SAMPAN.
นิรมล ยุวนบุณย์. (2007). น้ำพริก:ฐานทรัพยากรอาหาร วิถีชุมชน ภายใต้กระแสโลกาภิวัตน์. นนทบุรี:มูลนิธิชีววิถี.

See also 
Shrimp paste

Thai cuisine